The Delaware Expressway is a freeway in the U.S. state of Pennsylvania. It follows:
Interstate 95 from the Delaware state line to Bristol Township.
Interstate 295 from Bristol Township to the New Jersey state line.

Lists of Interstate Highways sharing the same title
Interstate 95